Four Jacks and a Jill is a 1942 musical comedy film starring Ray Bolger, Anne Shirley, June Havoc and Desi Arnaz.

It lost $113,000.

Plot
Nifty Sullivan, a bandleader, saves Katarina "Nina" Novak from being hit by a car, but rather than being grateful, Nina blames him for losing a ticket she had to a concert. Nifty escorts her there himself, then introduces her to his band, Four Jacks and a Queen, the queen being their singer, Opal.

Opal, who is dating a gangster called Noodle, quits the band, which then loses its nightclub job. Nina claims she once was a singer who entertained European royalty, King Stephen, and gets the band hired by a club owner called Hoople who believes her tale that the King himself will come see them perform.

Nifty realizes that Nina is both broke and a born liar. But, by coincidence, taxi driver Steve Sarto, who is trying to woo Opal, is a dead ringer for the King. He comes to the club pretending to be his majesty, but Noodle wants to flatten him for paying too much attention to Opal, and then confusion reigns when the actual King shows up.

Cast
 Ray Bolger as Nifty Sullivan
 Anne Shirley as Nina Novak (singing voice was dubbed by Martha Mears)
 June Havoc as Opal
 Desi Arnaz as Steve Sarto
 Eddie Foy, Jr. as Happy
 Jack Durant as Noodle
 Fritz Feld as Hoople
 Grady Sutton as nightclub patron

Musical numbers
 I'm in Good Shape
Sung and Danced by Ray Bolger

 I Haven't a Thing to Wear
Sung and Danced by June Havoc

 Karanina
Sung by Anne Shirley (dubbed by Martha Mears), Eddie Foy Jr., Jack Briggs and William Blees

 Boogie Woogie Conga
Sung and Danced by Ray Bolger, Eddie Foy Jr., Jack Briggs and William Blees

 Wherever You Go
Sung by Anne Shirley (dubbed by Martha Mears), then danced by Ray Bolger and Anne Shirley

 You Go Your Way
Sung by Anne Shirley (dubbed by Martha Mears)

 Boogie Woogie Conga (reprise)
Sung by Desi Arnaz, June Havoc, Bob Perry and Constantine Romanoff

References

External list
 Four Jacks and a Jill at IMDb
 
 
 

1942 films
1942 musical comedy films
American musical comedy films
Films directed by Jack Hively
RKO Pictures films
American black-and-white films
1940s American films